Skua is the designation of a British sounding rocket which was launched between 1959 and 1981 in 4 versions over 300 times. The Skua was developed by Bristol Aerojet and RPE Wescott. It consisted of a starting stage made up of several Chick rockets that burned for 0.2 seconds. They propelled the rocket 20 metres over the 5-metre-long launch tube. After that, the Bantam main stage ignited.

The fastest jetstream velocity ever measured (656 km/h or 408 mph) was recorded by instruments on board a Skua rocket above South Uist, Outer Hebrides, Scotland at an altitude of 47,000 m (154,200 ft), on 13 December 1967.

Skua 1
starting stage: 3 Chick rockets (could be one)
payload:  5 kg
ceiling: 70 km 
takeoff thrust: 20 kN 
takeoff weight: 58 kg 
diameter: 0.13 m
length: 2.24 m

Skua 2

starting stage: 4 Chick rockets 
upper stage: extended Bantam 
payload: 5 kg 
ceiling: 100 km 
takeoff thrust: 27 kN 
takeoff weight: 68 kg 
diameter: 0.13 m
length: 2.42 m

Skua 3

starting stage: 4 Chick rockets 
payload: 5 kg 
maximum height: 120 km 
takeoff thrust: 27 kN 
takeoff weight: 75 kg 
diameter: 0.13 m 
length: 2.80 m

Skua 4

starting stage: 4 Chick rockets 
upper stage: improved Bantam 
payload: 8 kg 
maximum height: 140 km 
takeoff thrust: 27 kN 
takeoff weight: 83 kg 
diameter: 0.13 m 
length: 2.80 m

References

External links
https://web.archive.org/web/20150824115536/http://www.astronautix.com/lvs/skua.htm

1974 in spaceflight
Sounding rockets of the United Kingdom